Gerd Vollum (18 July 1920 – 1 July 2009) was a Norwegian politician for the Labour Party.

She served as a deputy representative to the Parliament of Norway from Akershus during the term 1973–1977. In total she met during 40 days of parliamentary session.

References

1920 births
2009 deaths
Deputy members of the Storting
Labour Party (Norway) politicians
Akershus politicians
Women members of the Storting
20th-century Norwegian women politicians
20th-century Norwegian politicians